Herøysund is a village in Kvinnherad municipality in Vestland county, Norway. The village is located on the southeastern shore of the Hardangerfjorden, about half-way between the villages of Husnes (to the south) and Uskedal (to the north).

References

Villages in Vestland
Kvinnherad